Cowan railway station is a railway station located on the Main Northern line on the northern fringes of Sydney, New South Wales, Australia. It serves the suburb of Cowan, and the station was opened in 1890.

Cowan was a terminating point for CityRail suburban services until January 1992 when all services were curtailed at Berowra. A southbound passing loop is located immediately south of the station. In February 1999, it was extended south  to allow  freight trains to stable. North of the station the  Cowan Bank commences its descent to Hawkesbury River station and thereafter, crossing the Hawkesbury River.

Platforms and services
Cowan has two side platforms. It is serviced by NSW TrainLink Central Coast & Newcastle Line services travelling from Sydney Central to Newcastle.

Transport links
Transdev NSW operates one bus route via Cowan station:
592: Hornsby station to Mooney Mooney

Trackplan

See also 

 List of NSW TrainLink railway stations

References

External links

Cowan station details Transport for New South Wales

Easy Access railway stations in New South Wales
Railway stations in Australia opened in 1890
Regional railway stations in New South Wales
Short-platform railway stations in New South Wales, 4 cars
Hornsby Shire
Main North railway line, New South Wales